Ramón Gay (born Ramón García Gay; November 28, 1917 – May 28, 1960) was a Mexican film actor. He was one of the stars of the Golden Age of Mexican cinema, known to horror film fans for his role in The Aztec Mummy trilogy of films in the late 1950s.

He was killed in 1960, when he was shot dead during a dispute with another man over the actress, Evangelina Elizondo (1929–2017).

Selected filmography

 Five Faces of Woman (1947)
 Lola Casanova (1949)
 Tender Pumpkins (1949)
 Philip of Jesus (1949)
 Midnight (1949)
 Women Without Tomorrow (1951)
 The Ghost Falls In Love (1953)
 Camelia (1954)
 The Three Elenas (1954)
 The Aztec Mummy (1957)
 The Curse of the Aztec Mummy (1957)
 The Robot vs. The Aztec Mummy (1958)

References

Bibliography
 Doyle Greene. Mexploitation Cinema: A Critical History of Mexican Vampire, Wrestler, Ape-Man and Similar Films, 1957-1977. McFarland, 2005.

External links

1917 births
1960 deaths
Deaths by firearm in Mexico
Male actors from Mexico City
Mexican male film actors
Mexican male television actors